John St. John may refer to:

Politicians
John St. John (MP for Northamptonshire) (aft.1360-1424), MP for Northamptonshire in 1410, 1411, 1416, and 1421
John St. John (MP for Bedfordshire) (bef. 1495–1558), MP for Bedfordshire, 1539, 1542
John St. John (MP for Bletchingley) (died 1576), MP for Bletchingley in 1529
Sir John St John, 1st Baronet (1585–1648), MP for Wiltshire and prominent Royalist during the English Civil War
John St. John (American politician) (1833–1916), eighth Governor of Kansas and a candidate for President of the United States
John St John (died 1793) (c.1746–1793), MP for Newport, IoW 1773 and 1780 and Eye 1774–1780, Surveyor General of Crown Lands, 1775

Others
John St John, 2nd Baron St John of Bletso (died 1596), English peer
John P. St. John (police officer) (1918–1995), known as “Jigsaw John”, American police officer and Los Angeles Police Department Homicide detective
John St. John, guitarist of Sounds Incorporated
John St John, 11th Baron St John of Bletso (died 1757), British peer
John St John, 12th Baron St John of Bletso (1725–1767), British peer
John St John, 20th Baron St John of Bletso (1917–1976), English peer
Ian St John (born John St John, 1938–2021), Scottish footballer

See also 
Jon St. John (born 1960), American voice actor and singer
St John (name)